Vujadin Stanojković (Macedonian: Вујадин Станојковиќ; born 10 September 1963) is a Yugoslav and Macedonian former professional footballer and current manager.

Club career
Born in Kumanovo, Stanojković made his Yugoslav First League debuts with Vardar in the 1985–86 season. He won the Yugoslav Championship in 1987 with them, before the title was given to FK Partizan after their 6 points deduction was reversed.

He spent three more years at the club, before transferring to Partizan in the summer of 1989. He appeared in more than 100 official games over the next four seasons, winning one national championship and one national cup. In 1993, Stanojković moved abroad to Sweden and signed with Degerfors IF, staying there for three years. He also spent two seasons at Trelleborgs FF, before retiring from the game in 1998.

International career
Between 1988 and 1992, Stanojković was capped 21 times for Yugoslavia, scoring once. He took part at the 1990 World Cup, appearing in two games, as the team were eliminated in the quarter-finals by Argentina after penalties. Even after Macedonian independence, he was included in the Yugoslav squad for Euro 1992, but the nation would be suspended due to the Yugoslav Wars.

Following the breakup of Yugoslavia, Stanojković represented his native Macedonia, collecting seven caps from 1994 to 1995. His final international was a June 1995 FIFA World Cup qualification match against Belgium.

Managerial career
From 2004 to 2005, Stanojković was manager of Vardar. He subsequently served as an assistant to Macedonia manager Srečko Katanec between 2006 and 2009.

Honours
Partizan
 First League of FR Yugoslavia: 1992–93
 Yugoslav Cup: 1991–92
 Yugoslav Super Cup: 1989–90

References

External links
 Profile at MacedonianFootball.com
 
 
 
 

1963 births
Living people
Sportspeople from Kumanovo
Macedonian people of Serbian descent
Association football fullbacks
Yugoslav footballers
Yugoslavia international footballers
Footballers at the 1988 Summer Olympics
Olympic footballers of Yugoslavia
1990 FIFA World Cup players
Macedonian footballers
North Macedonia international footballers
Dual internationalists (football)
FK Vardar players
FK Partizan players
Degerfors IF players
Trelleborgs FF players
Yugoslav First League players
First League of Serbia and Montenegro players
Allsvenskan players
Macedonian expatriate footballers
Expatriate footballers in Sweden
Macedonian expatriate sportspeople in Sweden
Macedonian football managers
FK Makedonija Gjorče Petrov managers
FK Vardar managers
North Macedonia national under-21 football team managers